The European Christian Political Youth (ECPYouth) is a political youth organisation that brings together Christian, politically active young people from all over Europe to reinforce Christian politics in Europe. It is the independent youth organization of the European Christian Political Movement.

Background
The ECPYouth, until 2013 known as European Christian Political Youth Network (ECPYN) was established in July 2004 in Kortenberg (Belgium) by PerspectieF, Youth of the ChristenUnie (Netherlands) and other European Christian political youth organisations, such as the Christian Peoples Alliance Youth (United Kingdom). The founding of ECPYouth was one of the results of the International Summer School where young people from all over Europe participated.

Activities
Since the International Summer School in Kortenberg in 2004 summer schools are held annually around a specific theme or political issue and offers participants lectures, workshops and excursions. ECPYN/ECPYouth organized summer schools in 2005 in Lunteren, (Netherlands), in 2006 in Birstonas (Lithuania), in 2007 in Würzburg (Germany), in 2008 in Chişinău (Moldova), in 2009 in Risan (Montenegro), in 2010 in Ohrid (Republic of Macedonia), in 2011 in Paris (France), in 2012 in Zagreb (Croatia), in 2013 in Helsinki (Finland), in 2014 in Brussels (Belgium), in 2015 in Cambridge (United Kingdom), in 2016 in Bern (Switzerland), in 2017 in Odessa (Ukraine), in 2018 in Wroclaw (Poland), in 2019 in Tbilisi (Georgia (country)) and in 2021 in Kerns (Switzerland). 

ECPYouth started to organize winter schools in Lviv (Ukraine) in 2011 followed by Esztergom (Hungary) in 2012; and Soest (Netherlands) in 2013.

ECPYouth organises Regional Conferences as well in different parts of Europe and youth programs on conferences of the European Christian Political Movement. Regional conferences took place in 
 Hellenthal, Germany in October 2008
 Tbilisi, Georgia in October 2010 
 St. Vith, Belgium in October 2011
 Amsterdam in December 2015
 Tallinn in April 2016
 Tbilisi in September 2016
 Paris in April 2017

Furthermore, ECPYouth organizes study visits. In 2012 a study visit went to Podgorica, Montenegro to study the situation of minorities, especially the Roma, Ashkali and Egyptian groups. 
In 2012 ECPYouth started an in-depth training program, the ECPYouth Academy, under the title 'Crossroads – Christian Democratic Political Academy'. The first round took place in Timișoara, Romania; Zagreb, Croatia; Kyiv, Ukraine; and Soest, Netherlands.

In 2017 ECPYouth started holding bi-annual General Assemblies, instead of annual, one during the summer school and one in February, in the Netherlands. This was accompanied by political cafés, in 2018 on the topic of human trafficking.

Board

Member organisations
  - Youth Christian Democratic Movement
  - PCD Youth
  - New Generation PPCD
  - PerspectieF
  - SGP-jongeren
  - Young EVP 
  - Democratic Development Foundation
  - Christian Democratic Union of Youth

External links 
ECPYouth
PerspectieF
SGP-jongeren
ECPM

European Christian Political Youth, European
Christian democracy in Europe
Christian political organizations
European Christian Political Movement
Kortenberg